Laws and Regulations for Electronic Payment in Mauritius

The Electronic Transactions Act (ETA).

References

External links 
  National Computer Board

Economy of Mauritius